Nitecapone (INN; OR-462) is a drug which acts as a selective inhibitor of the enzyme catechol O-methyl transferase (COMT). It was patented as an antiparkinson medication but was never marketed.

See also
 Catechol-O-methyltransferase inhibitor

References

Catechol-O-methyltransferase inhibitors
Catechols
Diketones
Nitrophenols